Love, Luther is a four disc box set chronicling the musical career highlights of Luther Vandross. Promoted by the single "There’s Only You," the set includes unreleased demos, full-length album versions of Vandross' hit songs, and several of his productions for other artists.

Track listing
Disc One
"Ready for Love" (previously unreleased demo)
"If You Can't Dance" (previously unreleased demo)
Meet Luther Vandross (promotional single introducing LV to radio programmers)
"The Glow of Love" (performed by Change)
"Never Too Much" [Extended Version]
"Don't You Know That?"
"A House is Not a Home"
"Bad Boy/Having a Party"
"Since I Lost My Baby"
"She Loves Me Back"
"Who's Gonna Make It Easier for Me" (Duet with Delores Hall)
"If This World Were Mine" (Duet with Cheryl Lynn)
"How Many Times Can We Say Goodbye" (Duet with Dionne Warwick)
"Superstar/Until You Come Back to Me" (That's What I'm Gonna Do)

Disc Two
"If Only for One Night"
"Creepin'"
"Wait for Love"
"'Til My Baby Comes Home"
"It's Over Now"
"The Night I Fell in Love"
"There's Only You" (The Montserrat Sessions) (previously unreleased)
"Anyone Who Had a Heart" (The Montserrat Sessions) (previously unreleased)
"So Amazing" (The Montserrat Sessions) [Intimate Mix] (previously unreleased)
"Give Me the Reason"
"Stop to Love"
"There's Nothing Better Than Love" (duet with Gregory Hines)
"So Amazing"
"For You to Love"
"Here and Now"

Disc Three
"Love The One You're With"
"Funky Music (Is a Part of Me)" (performed by the group Luther)
"Georgy Porgy" (performed by Charme)
"Power of Love/Love Power"
"Don't Want to Be a Fool"
"I Want The Night to Stay"
"Endless Love" (Duet with Mariah Carey)
"Any Love"
"Knocks Me Off My Feet"
"Your Secret Love"
"Never Let Me Go"
"Can Heaven Wait"
"The Closer I Get to You" (Duet with Beyoncé Knowles)

Disc Four
"Isn't There Someone"
"Dance With My Father"
"Take You Out"
"I'd Rather"
"Buy Me a Rose"
"Shine"
"Got You Home"
"Jump to It" (performed by Aretha Franklin) [12" Version]
"Hot Butterfly" (performed by Gregg Diamond's Bionic Boogie) [Special Disco Re-mix by Jim Burgess]
"Searching" (live at Wembley Arena)
"Always and Forever" (live at the Royal Albert Hall)
Medley: "Windows of the World/What The World Needs Now" (live at Hammerstein Ballroom)
"The Lady Is a Tramp" (Duet with Frank Sinatra)
"A House Is Not a Home" (live at Radio City Music Hall) [previously unreleased mix]

References

Luther Vandross compilation albums
Epic Records compilation albums
2007 compilation albums
Compilation albums published posthumously